Sheridan Township is a township in Daviess County, in the U.S. state of Missouri.

Sheridan Township was established in 1869, and most likely was named after Philip Sheridan, an officer in the Civil War.

References

Townships in Missouri
Townships in Daviess County, Missouri